Alishahi or Ali Shahi may refer to:
 Ali Shahi, Fars
 Alishahi, Kerman